Pilon Peak is a prominent peak (1,880 m) standing 2 nautical miles (3.7 km) northeast of Mount Works along the west side of Horne Glacier, in the Everett Range, Concord Mountains. Mapped by United States Geological Survey (USGS) from ground surveys and U.S. Navy air photos, 1960–62. Named by Advisory Committee on Antarctic Names (US-ACAN) for Commander Jerome R. Pilon, U.S. Navy, Operations Officer of Antarctic Development Squadron Six (1967–68), Executive Officer (1968–69), and Commanding Officer (1969–70). Commander Pilon served on the Advisory Committee on Antarctic Names of the U.S. Board on Geographic Names, 1976–78.

Mountains of Victoria Land
Pennell Coast